Lara Bitter (born 24 April 1975) is a Dutch former professional tennis player.

Bitter was a junior doubles finalist at the 1993 French Open, partnering countrywoman Maaike Koutstaal. They were beaten in three sets by the Belgian pairing of Laurence Courtois and Nancy Feber.

On the professional circuit, Bitter reached a best singles ranking of 297 in the world and won an ITF tournament in Le Havre in 1994. As a doubles player she won a further six ITF titles, including four $25,000 events.

ITF finals

Singles: 3 (1–2)

Doubles: 8 (6–2)

References

External links
 
 

1975 births
Living people
Dutch female tennis players
20th-century Dutch women
20th-century Dutch people
21st-century Dutch women